George Peter Nanos Jr. is a retired vice admiral in the United States Navy and former director of the Los Alamos National Laboratory.

Early life
Nanos is from Bedford, New Hampshire. He received his bachelor's degree and was a Trident Scholar at the United States Naval Academy in 1967 and received his doctorate in physics from Princeton University in 1974.

Military career

Nanos served for 35 years in the United States Navy and retired as a vice admiral.

Nanos conducted many tours at sea aboard destroyers and carriers and is credited with the first-time application of systems engineering at the battle group level rather than just at the individual ship level. In 1989 he began ten years with the Navy's strategic programs overseeing the submarine inertial navigation and missile programs. In 1992, he became technical director of strategic system programs and, after promotion to rear admiral, was named director, where he served until 1999. Promoted to vice admiral, he served as the commander, Naval Sea Systems Command where he was responsible for design, development and logistics support for all navy ships and shipboard weapons systems until his retirement. In that capacity, he oversaw four nuclear repair shipyards, 10 defense laboratory divisions with more than 20,000 employees and over $23 billion in ship and weapons systems procurements, logistics and repairs.

He was awarded the Navy Distinguished Service Medal, the Legion of Merit (2 awards), the Meritorious Service Medal (5 awards), and
the Navy Achievement Medal.

Los Alamos National Laboratory
On January 6, 2003, Nanos began working as the interim director of Los Alamos National Lab.   On July 17, 2003, he was named director of the lab.

In May 2004, Nanos ordered an emergency shutdown of operations after classified computer disks were reported missing by a flawed auditing procedure, and a student suffered an eye injury from a laser beam in the same week.    "In no case will I authorize a restart until I'm absolutely convinced that each organization will not risk further compromise of safety, security and environment," Nanos said in an internal e-mail.  '"This willful flouting of the rules must stop, and I don't care how many people I have to fire to make it stop. If you think the rules are silly, if you think compliance is a joke, please resign now and save me the trouble," Nanos added in a separate e-mail to Los Alamos employees.  The shutdown was unprecedented in the history of the national laboratory complex, creating severe tensions between him and laboratory employees.

Nanos stepped down as director in May 2005.

Defense Threat Reduction Agency
In 2005, Nanos joined Defense Threat Reduction Agency (DTRA) as the associate director of research and development responsible for combating weapons of mass destruction (WMD) by providing R&D capabilities to reduce, eliminate, counter, and defeat the threat of WMD and mitigate their effects.  In 2007, Nanos joined JHU/APL and returned to DTRA on an Intergovernmental Personnel Act (IPA) assignment, eventually assuming the position of associate director of operations enterprise in October 2009. In that capacity, he led and directed all combat support, nuclear support, cooperative threat reduction, and on-site inspection activities for DTRA.

Johns Hopkins University / Applied Physics Laboratory
In 2007, Nanos joined the Applied Physics Laboratory (JHU/APL) and returned to Defense Threat Reduction Agency (DTRA) on an Intergovernmental Personnel Act (IPA) assignment, eventually assuming the position of associate director of operations enterprise in October 2009. In that capacity, he led and directed all combat support, nuclear support, cooperative threat reduction, and on-site inspection activities for DTRA.

In 2010, Nanos became a fellow in the National Security Analysis Department and later that same year accepted the temporary position as Head of the National Security Analysis Department at the Applied Physics Laboratory. In mid-2011, Nanos was appointed the acting head of the Global Engagement Department. Shortly thereafter, the laboratory completed a substantial reorganization, with Nanos being one of the key executives team members instrumental in providing the new framework. Upon completion of the reorganization and the official stand up of the Force Projection Department, Nanos was named the managing executive.

Notes and references

External links

 UCOP Biography (PDF)

1945 births
Living people
People from Bedford, New Hampshire
United States Naval Academy alumni
Princeton University alumni
United States Navy admirals
NAVSEA commanders
Recipients of the Navy Distinguished Service Medal
Recipients of the Legion of Merit
Los Alamos National Laboratory personnel